Hong Kong is scheduled to compete at the 2024 Summer Olympics in Paris from 26 July to 11 August 2024. It will be the territory's seventeenth appearance at the Summer Olympics since its debut as a British colony in 1952, except for Moscow 1980 as part of the United States-led boycott.

Competitors
The following is the list of number of competitors in the Games.

Swimming

Hong Kong swimmers achieved the entry standards in the following events for Paris 2024 (a maximum of two swimmers under the Olympic Qualifying Time (OST) and potentially at the Olympic Consideration Time (OCT)):

References

2024
Nations at the 2024 Summer Olympics
2024 in Hong Kong sport